Chuang Tang-Fa is a Taiwanese modern pentathlete. He competed at the 1988 Summer Olympics.

References

Year of birth missing (living people)
Living people
Taiwanese male modern pentathletes
Olympic modern pentathletes of Taiwan
Modern pentathletes at the 1988 Summer Olympics